IDB can mean:

 Discount Bank, one of Israel's leading banks, it sometimes is referred to as Israel Discount Bank
 European Injury Data Base, a database maintained by the European Union that contains standardized cross-national information on the external causes of injuries treated in emergency departments in the EU
 IDB Bank, a New York-based private and commercial bank with locations in the United States, Latin America and Israel, and a wholly owned subsidiary of Tel Aviv-based Discount Bank
 IDB Capital, New York-based broker dealer and wholly owned subsidiary of IDB Bank
 IDB Communications Group, Inc., a constituent of MCI Inc.
 IDB Development, an i investment group that, together with Discount Investment Corporation, manages a portfolio of investments in a range of companies.
 IDB-IIC Federal Credit Union, a not-for-profit, financial service cooperative owned by over 11,000 members and sponsored by the Inter-American Development Bank
 Illegal Diamond Buying, the term used at the turn of the 19th-20th century for diamond trading outside the De Beers cartel
 IndexedDB or Indexed Database API, a low-level API for client-side storage of significant amounts of structured data, including files/blobs
 Industrial Development Bank, now the Business Development Bank of Canada
 Industrial Development Board, boards with powers to raise levies from specific industrial sectors in the United Kingdom for coordinated action
 Industrial Development Board of the City of New Orleans, a public corporation and instrument of the New Orleans City Council to drive economic growth.
 Industrial Development Bureau, an agency of the Ministry of Economic Affairs of the Republic of China
 Industrial revenue bonds (formerly called Industrial Development Revenue Bonds) are bonds issued to construct facilities or purchase equipment which is then leased to a corporation
 Infectious Diseases Branch, a division of the California Department of Public Health that conducts surveillance, investigation, control and prevention of many important infectious diseases
 Involuntary denied boarding, a passenger being prevented from boarding an overbooked airline flight
 Institute for Defense and Business, a non-profit education and research institute.
 Integrated Database, a database maintained by the Federal Judicial Center that provides information on civil case and criminal defendant filings and terminations in the district courts, along with bankruptcy court and appellate court case information.
 Intel debugger, a proprietary debugger
 Inter-American Development Bank, the largest source of development financing for Latin America and the Caribbean.
 Intelligent drum and bass, a sub-genre of drum and bass music
 Interface Descriptor Block, a Cisco IOS internal data structure that contains information on network data
 Intermediate Debug File, a Visual Studio file type
 Internal drainage board, a type of English and Welsh water level management authority
 Irish Dairy Board, the former name of a co-operative enterprise in Ireland, now known as Ornua
 Islamic Development Bank, a multilateral development financing institution also known as ISDB
 US Census Bureau International Data Base, a database maintained by the US Census Bureau to provide public information about the census.